Coitocaecum is a genus of trematodes in the family Opecoelidae. It has been synonymised to Ozakia Wisniewski, 1934, Paradactylostomum Zhukov, 1972 nec Toman, 1992, and Pseudocoitocaecum Bilqees, 1972.

Species
Coitocaecum anaspidis Hickman, 1934
Coitocaecum austrosinicum Ding, 1993
Coitocaecum banneri Martin, 1960
Coitocaecum bengalense (Madhavi, Narasimhulu & Shameem, 1986)
Coitocaecum bombayense (Ahmad, 1984) Bray, 1987
Coitocaecum cadenati Dollfus, 1960
Coitocaecum callyodontis Yamaguti, 1942
Coitocaecum capense Bray, 1987
Coitocaecum chaetodoni Ahmad, 1984
Coitocaecum diplobulbosum Ozaki, 1929
Coitocaecum gerris (Shen, 1990) Liu, Peng, Gao, Fu, Wu, Lu, Gao & Xiao, 2010
Coitocaecum gymnophallum Nicoll, 1915
Coitocaecum indicum Ahmad, 1980
Coitocaecum kuhliae Machida, 2014
Coitocaecum lateolabracis (Shen & Qiu, 1995) Liu, Peng, Gao, Fu, Wu, Lu, Gao & Xiao, 2010
Coitocaecum latum Ozaki, 1929
Coitocaecum leptoscari Yamaguti, 1940
Coitocaecum manteri Ahmad, 1980
Coitocaecum manteri Parukhin, 1971
Coitocaecum michaeli Aken'Ova & Cribb, 1996
Coitocaecum minutum (Pritchard, 1966) Yamaguti, 1971
Coitocaecum muraenesocis Wang, Wang & Zhang, 1992
Coitocaecum norae Martin, 1960
Coitocaecum orientalis Dwivedi, 1978
Coitocaecum orthorchis Ozaki, 1926
Coitocaecum palaoense Ogata, 1942
Coitocaecum parvum Crowcroft, 1945
Coitocaecum pfluegeri (Yamaguti, 1970)
Coitocaecum plagiorchis Ozaki, 1926
Coitocaecum proavitum Wisniewski, 1933
Coitocaecum scombri Ahmad, 1980
Coitocaecum sigani Shen, 1990
Coitocaecum sillaginis (Shen, 1986) Liu, Peng, Gao, Fu, Wu, Lu, Gao & Xiao, 2010
Coitocaecum testiobliquum Wisniewski, 1933
Coitocaecum thapari Ahmad, 1980
Coitocaecum thrissoclesis (Bilqees, 1972) Bray, 1987
Coitocaecum tropicum Manter, 1940
Coitocaecum tylogonium Manter, 1954
Coitocaecum unibulbosum Ozaki, 1929
Coitocaecum xesuri Yamaguti, 1940
Coitocaecum zealandicum Hine, 1977

Species later synonymised with species of Coitocaecum
Coitocaecum bengalense (Madhavi, Narasimhulu & Shameem, 1986)
Paradactylostomum bengalense Madhavi, Narasimhulu & Shameem, 1986
Coitocaecum bombayense (Ahmad, 1984) Bray, 1987
Pseudocoitocaecum bombayensis Ahmad, 1984
Coitocaecum callyodontis Yamaguti, 1942
Ozakia callyodontis (Yamaguti, 1942) Yamaguti, 1971
Coitocaecum diplobulbosum Ozaki, 1929
Ozakia diplobulbosa (Ozaki, 1929) Wisniewski, 1933
Coitocaecum gerris (Shen, 1990) Liu, Peng, Gao, Fu, Wu, Lu, Gao & Xiao, 2010
Ozakia gerris Shen, 1990
Coitocaecum gymnophallum Nicoll, 1915
Coitocaecum glandulosum Yamaguti, 1934
Coitocaecum robustum Wang, 1984
Coitocaecum lateolabracis (Shen & Qiu, 1995) Liu, Peng, Gao, Fu, Wu, Lu, Gao & Xiao, 2010
Ozakia latelabracis Shen & Qiu, 1995
Ozakia lateolabracis Shen & Qiu, 1995
Coitocaecum latum Ozaki, 1929
Ozakia lata (Ozaki, 1929) Wisniewski, 1933
Coitocaecum minutum (Pritchard, 1966) Yamaguti, 1971
Nicolla minuta Pritchard, 1966
Coitocaecum orthorchis Ozaki, 1926
Ozakia orthorchis (Ozaki, 1926) Wisniewski, 1933
Coitocaecum pfluegeri (Yamaguti, 1970)
Ozakia pfluegeri Yamaguti, 1970
Coitocaecum proavitum Wisniewski, 1933
Excoitocaecum proavitum (Wisniewski, 1933) Slusarski, 1958
Coitocaecum sillaginis (Shen, 1986) Liu, Peng, Gao, Fu, Wu, Lu, Gao & Xiao, 2010
Ozakia sillaginis Shen, 1986
Coitocaecum testiobliquum Wisniewski, 1933
Excoitocaecum testiobliquum (Wisniewski, 1933) Slusarski, 1958
Coitocaecum thrissoclesis (Bilqees, 1972) Bray, 1987
Paradactylostomum indicum Zhukov, 1972
Pseudocoitocaecum thrissoclesis Bilqees, 1972
Coitocaecum unibulbosum Ozaki, 1929
Ozakia unibulbosa (Ozaki, 1929) Wisniewski, 1933

References

Opecoelidae
Plagiorchiida genera